César Cruz is a gang violence prevention advocate and Dean of Secondary Schools Program at Harvard University. He was born in Guadalajara  1974, coming to the United States as an undocumented immigrant at age 9, and holds a B.A. in history from UC Berkeley, and a doctorate in educational leadership from Harvard Graduate School of Education. On May 1, 1992, he was one of 65 people arrested marching on the San Francisco–Oakland Bay Bridge after the acquittal of officers charged with beating Rodney King. In 1995, he was involved in a fifteen-day hunger strike at University of California, Irvine. The 1995 strike was undertaken by Cruz and others from UC Berkeley and UC Irvine to protect and promote affirmative action at UC Irvine. Cruz was later part of a 26-day hunger strike in 2004, which resulted in Governor Arnold Schwarzenegger agreeing to refinance the West Contra Costa Unified School District's high interest loans. He was keynote speaker for the Cesar Chavez Convocation at UC Santa Cruz in 2014 and Hermanos Unidos National Conference at California State University, Fullerton in 2017. Research at Homeboy Industries, a job skills program in the Los Angeles area for gang members, served as his Harvard doctoral capstone work. He was the first male Mexican-immigrant to earn a doctorate at Harvard's Education Leadership program.

He was awarded the Orange County Human Rights Award in 1995 and the Peacemaker of the Year award by the California State Senate in 2005. In 2011, he was awarded a local Jefferson Award for Public Service for his work with the Homies Empowerment program.

Bibliography
Preciado-Cruz, César A, Revenge of the Illegal Alien: A Mexican Takes on the Empire, 2008, Oakland: Making Changes Press, 
Preciado-Cruz, César A, Norteños/Sureños : time to 'bang' for freedom : a brief history of the conflict between the Mexican Mafia and Nuestra familia (2009) (alternate title Bang For Freedom; A Brief History of Mexican Mafia, Nuestra Familia and Latino Activism in the U.S. (2015)), Oakland: Making Changes Press, 
Voces: A Journal of Chicana/Latina Studies Vol. 2, No. 2, Special Poetry Issue (Summer 1999) Published by Mujeres Activas en Letras y Cambio Social (MALCS)

See also

References

External links

Harvard University staff
People from Guadalajara, Jalisco
Mexican emigrants to the United States
Living people
University of California, Berkeley alumni
Harvard Graduate School of Education alumni
1974 births
Activists from the San Francisco Bay Area
Activists for Hispanic and Latino American civil rights
Undocumented immigrants to the United States